All Saints Church is an Eastern Orthodox church in Riga, the capital of Latvia. The church is situated at the address 10 Katoļu Street.

References

External links 

Churches in Riga
Eastern Orthodox churches in Latvia
Church buildings with domes